Beled Hawo District  is a Reer sanyar dagmo district in the southwestern Gedo region of Somalia. Its capital is Beled Hawo.

References

External links
 Districts of Somalia
 Administrative map of Beled Hawo District

Districts of Somalia

Gedo